Kuhlan Affar District is a district of the Hajjah Governorate, Yemen. As of 2003, the district had a population of 40,333 inhabitants.

See also
Kuhlan Affar

References

Districts of Hajjah Governorate